The 2015 Étoile de Bessèges  (English: Star of Bessèges) was the 45th running of the Étoile de Bessèges road cycling stage race. It was rated as a 2.1 event on the UCI Europe Tour and took place from 4 to 8 February 2015 in southern France, near the town of Bessèges. It was the first stage race of the 2015 European season.

The race consisted of five stages, four of which were road stages and the last of which was an individual time trial. The 2014 champion was Tobias Ludvigsson, but his  was not selected to take part in the 2015 edition.

The race was won by Bob Jungels, who won the time trial on the final day. He finished nine seconds ahead of the second placed rider, 's Tony Gallopin, with Gallopin's teammate Kris Boeckmans a further second back in third place. Edward Theuns won the points competition, while Julien Loubet won the mountains competition. The best young rider was Alexis Gougeard.  were the best team.

Teams
Twenty-one teams competed in the 2015 Étoile de Bessèges. These included four UCI WorldTeams, nine UCI Professional Continental and eight UCI Continental teams.

The teams that participated in the race were:

Route

Stages

Stage 1
4 February 2015 — Bellegarde to Beaucaire,

Stage 2
5 February 2015 — Nîmes to Les Fumades,

Stage 3
6 February 2015 — Bessèges to Bessèges,

Stage 4
7 February 2015 — L'Ardoise to Laudun,

Stage 5
8 February 2015 — Alès to Alès, individual time trial (ITT)

Classification leadership table
In the 2015 Étoile de Bessèges, four different jerseys were awarded. For the general classification, calculated by adding each cyclist's finishing times on each stage, and allowing time bonuses for the first three finishers at intermediate sprints and at the finish of mass-start stages, the leader received an orange jersey. This classification was considered the most important of the 2015 Étoile de Bessèges, and the winner of the classification was considered the winner of the race.

Additionally, there was a points classification, which awarded a yellow jersey. In the points classification, cyclists received points for finishing in the top 15 in a mass-start stage. For winning a stage, a rider earned 25 points, with 20 for second, 16 for third, 13 for fourth, 11 for fifth with a point fewer per place down to a single point for 15th place. Points towards the classification could also be accrued at intermediate sprint points during each stage; these intermediate sprints also offered bonus seconds towards the general classification. There was also a mountains classification, the leadership of which was marked by a blue jersey. In the mountains classification, points were won by reaching the top of a climb before other cyclists, with more points available for the higher-categorised climbs.

The fourth jersey represented the young rider classification, marked by a white jersey. This was decided in the same way as the general classification, but only riders born after 1 January 1992 were eligible to be ranked in the classification. There was also a classification for teams, in which the times of the best three cyclists per team on each stage were added together; the leading team at the end of the race was the team with the lowest total time.

Final results

General classification

References

External links 
 

2015 UCI Europe Tour
2015 in French sport
2015